Diaporthella is a genus of fungi in the family Valsaceae.

External links 

 Diaporthella at Index Fungorum

Gnomoniaceae